

Discography

This is the discography of the industrial metal band Die Kur

Studio albums
 From Dark (Renaissance of Evil) (2006)
 The Fall of The Empire (2009)
 ERA (Formicidae) (2011)
 Manifesto (2015)
 Regime: The Unsettling March to the World Domination (2021)

From Dark (Renaissance of Evil)
Artist: Die Kur

Album: From Dark (Renaissance of Evil)

Year: 2006

Label: NMTCG

Tracks: 17

Track listing

The Fall of The Empire
Artist: Die Kur

Album: The Fall of The Empire

Year: 2009

Label: NMTCG

Tracks: 14

Track listing

ERA (Formicidae)
Artist: Die Kur

Album: ERA (Formicidae)

Year: 2011

Label: NMTCG

Tracks: 12

Track listing

Manifesto EP
Artist: Die Kur

EP: Manifesto
Year: 2013

Label: NMTCG

Tracks: 3(+1)

Track listing

Manifesto

Album: Manifesto
Artist: Die Kur
Year: 2015
Label: NMTCG

Tracks: 32
Discs: 2

Manifesto Part 1: Modern Society Manifesto

Artist: Die Kur

Album: Manifesto Part 1: Modern Society Manifesto

Year: 2015

Label: NMTCG

Tracks: 16

Track listing

Manifesto Part 2: Songs of Freedom

Artist: Die Kur

Album: Manifesto Part 2: Songs of Freedom

Year: 2015

Label: NMTCG

Tracks: 16

Track listing

Regime: The Unsettling March to the World Domination

Artist: Die Kur

Year: 2021

Label: NMTCG

Tracks: 12

Track listing

Singles
 "Hell Machine" (2003)
 "Nihilist Act" (2003)
 "17 Seconds of Pure Pleasure" (2004)
 "A Postcard from Infers" (2004)
 "The Renaissance of Evil" (2005)
 "Diamond Disease" (2006)
 "The Chemistry Steamer" (2006)
 "Under the Empire of the Sun to Follow" (2007)
 "Empyrean Hymn" (2008)
 "Evolution/Revolution" (2008)
 "Attack Pheromone" (2010)
 "Hymenoptera" (2011)
 "New Era" (2011)
 "Forging Araneae" (2012)
 "It Must Be (Destroyed)" (2013)
 "The Order of Things to be" (2013)
 "With Us / Against Us" (2014)
 "Conceptualising the War Machine" (2015)
 "The Leader of Zeros" (2015)
 "Servants of the Netherworld" (2016)
 "Beneath the Waves" (2017)

EPs
"Manifesto EP" (2013)
 "All the Way Down to a New Regime" (2018)

References

Die Kur Website

External links
 Die Kur Official website 
 Die Kur Official Facebook Page 
 NMTCG website 

Discographies of British artists